Events from the year 1581 in Ireland.

Incumbent
Monarch: Elizabeth I

Events

April 19 – general pardon offered to participants in the Second Desmond Rebellion (other than the leaders).
Dermot O'Hurley appointed Archbishop of Cashel by Pope Gregory XIII, but is unable to enter Ireland until 1583 when he was imprisoned in Dublin Castle and hanged for treason in 1584.
John Derricke publishes The Image of Irelande, with a Discoverie of Woodkarne.

Births

January 4 – James Ussher, Anglican Archbishop of Armagh and Primate of All Ireland, published the Ussher chronology purporting to time and date creation (died 1656).

Deaths

 Nicholas Sanders, English Catholic priest and an exiled leader of the Second Desmond Rebellion (b. c.1530).

References

 
1580s in Ireland
Years of the 16th century in Ireland